The 1980 Detroit Lions season was the 51st season in franchise history. As the result of their 2–14 1979 season, the Lions were able to select Heisman Trophy-winning Oklahoma Sooner halfback Billy Sims with the first pick in the NFL draft. In his rookie season, Sims rushed his way to the Offensive Rookie of the Year Award while carrying the Lions back to respectability. After winning their first four games, the Lions stumbled down the stretch including costly 1-point losses to the Colts and lowly Cardinals, where Cardinals running back Nathan Micknick out ran the Lions newly signed, struggling linebacker Aidan Smith to put the Cardinals up by 1 in the closing minutes. While they vastly improved overall, finishing 9–7, the Lions narrowly lost the NFC Central Division title to the Minnesota Vikings by virtue of a conference record tiebreaker. The Lions won nine NFC games to the Vikings’ eight, but Minnesota had a better winning percentage in the conference. The Lions’ 1979 fifth-place finish meant they played two extra NFC games, resulting in five conference losses to the Vikings' four losses.

Offseason

Draft

Roster

Regular season
In his NFL debut, Billy Sims had three touchdowns.

Schedule

Standings

Game Summaries

Week 1 at Rams

Week 2: at Green Bay Packers

Week 5: at Atlanta Falcons

Week 13

Awards and records
 Billy Sims, 1980 Offensive Rookie of the Year
 Billy Sims, 1980 UPI NFL-NFC Rookie of the Year
 Billy Sims, Associated Press Offensive Rookie of the Year

See also
 1980 in Michigan

References

External links
Detroit Lions on Pro Football Reference
Detroit Lions on jt-sw.com
Detroit Lions on The Football Database

Detroit Lions
Detroit Lions seasons
Detroit Lions